Robert Gillespie (20 October 1904 – 1971) was an English footballer who played at inside-left.

Career
Gillespie played for Newton Heath Loco, Oldham Athletic and Luton Town, before joining Port Vale in May 1927. He hit 12 goals in 23 Second Division games in 1927–28, including braces against Southampton and Barnsley. He tore an elbow in December 1928, and could only find two goals in 14 games in 1928–29 as the club was relegated into the Third Division North. He featured just once in 1929–30, and was handed a free transfer to Wrexham. He later turned out for Northwich Victoria, Barrow, Boston United, Nelson, Brierley Hill Alliance and Ashton National Gas.

Career statistics
Source:

References

1904 births
1971 deaths
Footballers from Manchester
English footballers
Association football inside forwards
Oldham Athletic A.F.C. players
Luton Town F.C. players
Port Vale F.C. players
Wrexham A.F.C. players
Northwich Victoria F.C. players
Barrow A.F.C. players
Boston United F.C. players
Nelson F.C. players
Brierley Hill Alliance F.C. players
Ashton National F.C. players
English Football League players
Midland Football League players